Soldier of Arete is a 1989 fantasy novel by American writer Gene Wolfe, published by Tor Books. The novel is a sequel to Soldier of the Mist.

Soldier of the Mist and Soldier of the Arete have been collected as Latro in the Mist.

Synopsis
Wolfe's forgetful  protagonist Latro keeps on traveling throughout ancient Greece.

References

External links
Google books profile

Novels by Gene Wolfe
Fiction with unreliable narrators
1989 American novels
American fantasy novels
1989 fantasy novels
Fictional diaries
Tor Books books